The Peasants Mutual Aid Association (VdgB) was an East German mass organization for peasants and farmers, later also gardeners. It was founded in the 1945–1946 period and was a participant in the National Front. From 1950 to 1963 and again in 1986, it had representation in the Volkskammer.

In 1989, a GDR publication put the membership of the VdgB at 632,000 persons. During the Peaceful Revolution, the VdgB suffered because of its extensive connections with the ruling Socialist Unity Party. In February 1990, it changed its name to the Farmers Association of the GDR but was unable to make the transition from East German society to that of a reunified Germany. It was fully liquidated in 1994.

From 1979 to 1990, the VdgB operated the Ringberghaus, a large hotel east of the city of Suhl. The hotel's purpose was to provide accommodation for farmers on holiday in the Thuringian Forest, and a VdgB voucher was required for lodging.

Chairmen of the VdgB

References

External links
 Association for Mutual Farmers Assistance 1949–1990 (East Germany)

Organisations based in East Germany
Mass organisations of East Germany
1940s establishments in Germany